The PFL 1 mixed martial arts event for the 2022 season of the Professional Fighters League was held on April 20, 2022 at the Esports Stadium Arlington in Arlington, Texas. This marked the first regular season event of the tournament and included fights in the Lightweight and Light Heavyweight divisions.

Background 
The event was headlined by a lightweight clash between Clay Collard and UFC veteran Jeremy Stephens, while 2021 champion Raush Manfio faces two-time UFC veteran Don Madge in the co-main event. The remaining two fights of the main card saw defending light heavyweight champion Antônio Carlos Júnior face off against Delan Monte, while 2019 champion Natan Schulte took on Olivier Aubin-Mercier. 

A lightweight bout between former WEC and UFC Lightweight Champion Anthony Pettis and Bellator veteran Myles Price was scheduled for the event but the bout was later moved to PFL 3.

Results

Standings After Event 
The PFL points system is based on results of the match.  The winner of a fight receives 3 points.  If the fight ends in a draw, both fighters will receive 1 point. The bonus for winning a fight in the first, second, or third round is 3 points, 2 points, and 1 point respectively. The bonus for winning in the third round requires a fight be stopped before 4:59 of the third round.  No bonus point will be awarded if a fighter wins via decision.  For example, if a fighter wins a fight in the first round, then the fighter will receive 6 total points. A decision win will result in three total points.  If a fighter misses weight, the opponent (should they comply with weight limits) will receive 3 points due to a walkover victory, regardless of winning or losing the bout;  if the non-offending fighter subsequently wins with a stoppage, all bonus points will be awarded.

Light Heavyweight

Lightweight

See also 

 List of PFL events
 List of current PFL fighters

References 

Professional Fighters League
2022 in mixed martial arts
April 2022 sports events in the United States
Events in Arlington, Texas